Aggsbach is a small wine-growing town in the Krems-Land district of Lower Austria, Austria. As of 2001, it has a population of 714 and an area of 13.72 km.²
Aggsbach was first mentioned in an 1148 document calling it "Accusabah".

Population

Venus von Willendorf
Today Aggsbach is most famous for being the place where the Venus of Willendorf was found, in the Willendorf hamlet. The actual female fertility figure is located in the Naturhistorisches Museum in Vienna, while a life size reproduction is located in a field in Willendorf. The other hamlets are Aggsbach Markt (the main town), Groisbach, and Köfering.

References

Cities and towns in Krems-Land District
Venus of Willendorf